Leonay is a suburb of Sydney, in the state of New South Wales, Australia 58 kilometres west of the Sydney central business district, in the local government area of the City of Penrith. It is part of the Greater Western Sydney region.

Leonay is located on the western side of the Nepean River, at the foot of the Blue Mountains. The suburb is bounded by the M4 Motorway, the western railway line, and the Nepean River. One of Leonay's prominent features is the golf course which meanders through the suburb.

History 
The area was once the vineyard of Leo Buring, the suburb is named after Leo and his wife Nay. The vineyard has been replaced with designer homes climbing the hill at the foot of the Blue Mountains Escarpment.

Aboriginal culture 
Prior to European settlement, what is now Leonay was home to the Mulgoa people who spoke the Darug language. They lived as both hunter-gatherer and in a land management system governed by traditional laws including when certain foods would be cultivated or left alone. These are ancient traditions which evolved from early human origins in the Dreamtime. Their homes were bark huts called 'gunyahs'. They hunted kangaroos and emus for meat, and gathered yams, berries and other native plants.

European settlement 
The first British explorers known to have visited Leonay were Jamison, Johnston, Wentworth and Jones in 1818 who named Glenbrook Creek at the point where it enters the Nepean River in what is now Leonay. For many years it was considered part of neighbouring Emu Plains first as part of Sir Francis Forbes' Edinglassie Estate and then as part of Leo Buring's vineyard, Leonay. During the early years of settlement, Buring had a small fort, Fort Sanctuary, constructed to overlook his vineyard. Following Buring's death in 1961, the vineyard closed down and most of the land was sold to developers. The first houses were built in 1965 and in 1974, the name was officially changed to Leonay. Leonay Post Office opened on 1 December 1977 and closed in 1979.  Many homeless individuals made use of Fort Sanctuary as a shelter until it was boarded up in 1987; a small but influential local movement exists calling for the fort to be heritage listed.

Transport 
The nearest railway station is Lapstone Railway Station (accessible by walking only) and the nearest road accessible railway station is Emu Plains Railway Station on the Western Line of the Sydney Trains network. The local bus service is provided by the Blue Mountains Bus Company and connects Leonay to Penrith. Leonay Parade is the main road into the suburb, connecting with both Emu Plains and the M4 Western Motorway, which in turn provides quick connection to greater Sydney and the Blue Mountains.

Education 
Leonay Public School is the only school in the suburb. The nearest high school is Nepean Creative and Performing Arts High School in Emu Plains.

Population

Demographics 
The recorded population of Leonay in the 2016 census was 2,518. Most residents were Australian born (78.4%) with the next most common places of birth being England (5.6%) and Germany (1.3%) and Scotland (1.0%). 88.6% of people spoke only English at home. The most common responses for religion were Catholic 31.3%, No Religion 24.4% and Anglican 22.9%. Reflecting the era in which the suburb developed, there are no apartments or terraces in the suburb with all 899 dwellings being detached houses. The median income ($2,153 per week) was noticeably higher than the national average ($1,438).

Notable residents 

Nathan Cleary (Professional Rugby League player for the Penrith Panthers)

Ivan Cleary (Professional Rugby League coach for the Penrith Panthers)

Governance 
At a local government level, Leonay is part of the south ward of Penrith City Council, represented by Jim Aitken OAM, Mark Davies, Karen McKeown and Kath Presdee. The current mayor is John Thain. At the state level, it is part of the Electoral district of Penrith, represented by Liberal MP Stuart Ayres, who also lives in the suburb. Federally, it is part of the Division of Lindsay, represented by Melissa McIntosh of the Liberal Party.

References

External links 
 Penrith City Local History

Suburbs of Sydney
City of Penrith